Honey Love may refer to:

Music
 Honey Love (The Drifters song)
 Honey Love (R. Kelly song)

People
 CoCo Brown, American pornographic actress who has used the alias Honey Love